The 1994 African Cup of Champions Clubs was the 30th edition of the annual international club football competition held in the CAF region (Africa), the African Cup of Champions Clubs. It determined that year's club champion of association football in Africa.

Espérance from Tunisia won that final, and became for the first time CAF club champion.

Preliminary round

|}

First round

|}

Second round

|}

Quarter-finals

|}

Semi-finals

|}

Final

Champion

Top scorers

The top scorers from the 1994 African Cup of Champions Clubs are as follows:

Notes & references

Notes

References
1994 African Cup of Champions Clubs - rsssf.com

1
African Cup of Champions Clubs